Verra may refer to:

 Verra or Verified Carbon Standard, a standard for certifying carbon emissions reductions
 Ryan Verra, a Canadian entrepreneur and professional race car driver from Calgary.
 Joan Verra, a fictional character